WHDD-FM (91.9 FM, "Robin Hood Radio") is a NPR-affiliated radio station licensed to serve Sharon, Connecticut. WHDD-FM is owned by Tri-State Public Communications, Inc.

See also
List of community radio stations in the United States

References

External links
 WHDD official website
 

HDD-FM
News and talk radio stations in the United States
Community radio stations in the United States
Sharon, Connecticut
NPR member stations
Radio stations established in 2008
2008 establishments in Connecticut